Dwight Gregory Sutherland (born April 25, 1969, Saint George, Barbados) is a Barbadian politician. He is a member of parliament in the House of Assembly of Barbados. He was  elected member of parliament in January 2022. He also serves as the Minister of Housing, Lands and Maintenance since January 24, 2022, in the cabinet of Mia Mottley.

References 

Living people
People from Saint George, Barbados
1969 births
Barbadian politicians
Barbados Labour Party politicians